Arnold Field  is a privately owned, public-use airport located two nautical miles (2.3 mi, 3.7 km) northeast of the central business district of Croswell, a city in Sanilac County, Michigan, United States.

Facilities and aircraft 
It has one runway with a turf surface: 18/36 is 2,570 by 140 feet (783 x 43 m). Runway 7/25 was a turf crosswind runway that is no longer in use.  

For the 12-month period ending December 31, 2021, the airport had 200 general aviation aircraft operations, an average of 17 per month. At that time there were 7 aircraft based at this airport: 6 single-engine airplanes and 1 ultralight.

Accidents and incidents 

 On September 3, 2021, a Mooney M20K was destroyed when it impacted a pole, trees, and terrain after takeoff from the Arnold Field Airport. The pilot reported the turbocharger did not kick in and acceleration slow as he started the takeoff roll, but he disregarded the issue because he was on a grass field and near max gross weight. The plane continued to underperform after going airborne, and while the pilot cleared trees nearby, he couldn't clear the power lines. The pilot tried aiming for a sliver in the tree line to land, but the right wing clipped a phone pole and the aircraft came down. The probable cause was found to be the pilot's failure to abort the takeoff.

References

External links 
 Arnold Field (55G) at Michigan DOT Airport Directory
 Aerial photo as of 24 April 2000 from USGS The National Map

Airports in Michigan
Transportation in Sanilac County, Michigan